Charles Grey may refer to:

People
Charles Grey, 7th Earl of Kent (1540s–1623), Lord Lieutenant of Bedfordshire
Charles Grey, 1st Earl Grey (1729–1807), British Army general
Charles Grey, 2nd Earl Grey (1764–1845), British Prime Minister, after whom Earl Grey tea is named
Sir Charles Edward Grey (1785–1865), British Member of Parliament for Tynemouth and North Shields, then Governor of Barbados, 1841–1846
Charles Grey (British Army officer) (1804–1870), British Army general, Member of Parliament for Wycombe, and Private Secretary to Prince Albert and Queen Victoria
Charles Grey (mayor) (1859–1925), New Zealand businessman and mayor of Auckland City
C. G. Grey (1875–1953), English aviation writer
Charles Grey, 5th Earl Grey (1879–1963), English nobleman
Charles Gossage Grey (1894–1987), American World War I flying ace
Charles Grey (politician) (1903–1984), British Member of Parliament for Durham, 1945–1970
Edwin Charles Tubb (1919–2010), British writer who used Charles Grey as a pseudonym

Television characters
Charles Grey (The Unit), fictional character in United States television series The Unit
Colonel White, a character in the TV series Captain Scarlet whose "real" name is Charles Grey

See also
Charles Gray (disambiguation)